Fort William is a fort in Anomabu, Central Region, Ghana, originally known as Fort Anomabo and renamed Fort William in the nineteenth century by its then-commander, Brodie Cruickshank, who added one storey to the main building in the days of King William IV. It was built in 1753 by the British after they thwarted a French attempt to establish a fort at the same place. Two earlier forts had been established at the same site, one in 1640 by the Dutch, another in 1674 (Fort Charles) by the English.  Fort Charles was abandoned in 1730 and destroyed. Along with several other castles and forts in Ghana, Fort William was inscribed on the UNESCO World Heritage List in 1979 because of its importance during and testimony to the Atlantic slave trade.

History

Earlier forts 
In 1640, the Dutch built the first simple fort in the form of stone nog and brick lodge under the direction of Commander, Arent Jacobsz van der Graeff.
In 1653, the Swedes captured the lodge.
In 1657, Danish forces took the lodge under Caerloff.
In 1659 or 1660, the Dutch recaptured it.
When the second Anglo-Dutch war ended in 1667 with the (Treaty of Breda), the English gained a foothold in Anomabo.
In 1672 or 1673, the English began building Fort Charles, naming it after King Charles II of England, on the present-day location of Fort William. An early Anomabo chief, perhaps Eno or Eno Besi, inhabited the Dutch lodge at this time and declared it his palace.
The fort was abandoned by the English not long after, in order to concentrate efforts and costs on Fort Carolusburg at Cape Coast.

"Ten Percenters" base 
In 1698, the Royal African Company "licensed" ship captains not in its employment upon the payment of a 10% "affiliation fee" to enable them to trade in its areas of monopoly. There followed a flood of "Ten Percenters" trading at British forts, often outnumbering the company's own ships. Anomabu became a popular haunt of "ten percenters" (until their licensing was stopped in 1712), exporting vast numbers of slaves.

In 1717, the Dutch director-general at Elmina, Engelgraaf Roberts, quoting an English captain on Anomabu slave trade exports, stated: "From January 1702 to August 1708 they took to Barbados and Jamaica [from Anomabu] a total of not less than 30,141 slaves and in this figure are not included transactions made for other ships sailing to such Islands as Nevis, Montserrat, St. Christopher, for the South Sea Company, the New Netherlands and others which would increase the above number considerably, and of which Annemaboe alone could provide about one third."

Fort William 

In 1753, after thwarting a French bid to establish a fort at Anomabu the British African Company of Merchants (successor to the Royal African Company) began construction of Fort William, also known as Anomabu Castle, designed by military engineer John Apperly, who became its first governor.

After Apperly's death in 1756, Irishman Richard Brew took over the governorship of the fort and completed its construction in 1760.

Fort William became the center of British slave trading along the Gold Coast until the slave trade was outlawed in 1807.

Anomabu is a popular tourist destination. The well-preserved remains of Fort William can still be seen.

Gallery

Notable residents and prisoners 
 Venture Smith
 William Ansah Sessarakoo

References 

Infrastructure completed in 1753
History of Ghana
Castles in Ghana
Dutch Gold Coast
African slave trade
1640 establishments in the Dutch Empire
1653 establishments in the Swedish colonial empire
1667 establishments in the British Empire
William
African Company of Merchants
W